Petrobium is a genus in the family Asteraceae.

The only known species is Petrobium arboreum, called Saint Helena whitewood. It is found in the tree-fern thicket at the top of the central ridge of island of Saint Helena in the South Atlantic Ocean. The plants are either female or hermaphrodite, i.e. the species is gynodioecious.

See also 
 Flora of St Helena

References

External links 
 Mongabay: Petrobium

Monotypic Asteraceae genera
Coreopsideae
Flora of Saint Helena
Endangered plants